The Deputy Director of the Federal Bureau of Investigation (formerly known as the Associate Director) is a senior United States government position in the Federal Bureau of Investigation. The office is second in command to the Director of the Federal Bureau of Investigation. If the director is absent or the position is vacant, the deputy director automatically takes on the additional title and role of acting director. The office is also the highest position attainable within the FBI without being appointed by the President of the United States. Responsibilities as deputy director include assisting the director and leading prominent investigations. All other FBI executives and special agents in charge report to the director through the deputy director. From 1978 to 1987, the position of deputy director was not filled due to William Hedgcock Webster's decision to divide the deputy's responsibility between three positions.

Paul Abbate, former associate deputy director of the FBI, was named deputy director on February 1, 2021.

Deputy directors

Fictional deputy directors
 Alvin Kersh, the deputy director of the FBI on The X-Files.
 Avery Ryan, the deputy director of the FBI and the director of the FBI's Cyber division. She is the protagonist of CSI: Cyber.
 Miranda Shaw, the deputy director of the FBI on Quantico.
 Owen Hall, the deputy director of the FBI on Quantico.
Gordon Cole, the deputy director of the FBI on Twin Peaks.
Victor Fitzgerald, deputy director of the FBI on Without A Trace.
Jason Atwood, the deputy director of the FBI on Designated Survivor.
Douglas Bailey, the deputy director of the FBI on Criminal Minds.

References

Deputy Directors of the Federal Bureau of Investigation